Moses Hacmon (born October 29, 1977) is an Israeli photographer.

Education 
Hacmon studied cinematography and fine art at the Avni Institute of Art and Design and attended the Technion – Israel Institute of Technology. In 2006, he completed his Bachelor of Architecture, with the AIA honors award, from the Southern California Institute of Architecture.

Career 

Faces of Water was Hacmon's first project that was released in 2013. It is the debut of his technique that captures water's invisible forms. Kyle VanHemert of Wired says "Hacmon worked out a technique involving a special type of film with a layer of liquid that records the movement of the water itself. The film leaves Hacmon with a full-size negative, which he then develops into pictures like the ones here–an analog process from start to finish."

Personal life 
Hacmon was born in Tel Aviv, Israel and moved to the US in 2002. He completed a Bachelor of Architecture with AIA honors, from Southern California Institute of Architecture. Hacmon married Trisha Paytas in December 2021. In February 2022, Paytas announced that she was pregnant. The couple's first child was born in September 2022.

References 

Israeli artists
Living people
1977 births
Southern California Institute of Architecture alumni
Artists from Tel Aviv